The 2013–14 season of the Norwegian Premier League, the highest bandy league for men in Norway.

Twenty-one games were played, with 2 points given for wins and 1 for draws. Stabæk won the league, whereas Høvik and Drammen survived a relegation playoff.

League table

References

Seasons in Norwegian bandy
2013 in bandy
2014 in bandy
Band
Band